Wilhelm August Streitberg (23 February 1864, in Rüdesheim am Rhein – 19 August 1925, in Leipzig) was a German Indo-Europeanist, specializing in Germanic languages. Together with Karl Brugmann he  founded the  Indogermanische Forschungen journal.

He studied Germanistics and Indo-European philology at Münster Academy and at the universities of Berlin and Leipzig, receiving his habilitation for Indo-European linguistics at Münster in 1889. In 1906 he became a full professor, and three years later relocated to the University of Munich as a professor of Indo-European linguistics. In 1920 he returned to Leipzig, where he taught classes up until his death in 1925. From 1911 to 1920 he was a member of the Bavarian Academy of Sciences.

Works
1896 Urgermanische Grammatik. 
1897 Gotisches Elementarbuch. (2nd edition 1906, 3rd and 4th editions 1910, 5th and 6th editions 1920).
1908 Die gotische Bibel (as editor).

Notes

External links

TITUS-Galeria: Streitberg at titus.uni-frankfurt.de
http://www.indogermanistik.lmu.de/geschichte/Streitberg.htm
 Gotisch-Griechisch-Deutsches Wörterbuch (1910)
 Gotisches Elementarbuch (1920)

1864 births
1925 deaths
Linguists from Germany
Indo-Europeanists
Linguists of Indo-European languages
Linguists of Germanic languages
Academic staff of the Ludwig Maximilian University of Munich
Academic staff of Leipzig University
Academic staff of the University of Münster
People from Rheingau-Taunus-Kreis